Work Song is an album by jazz cornetist Nat Adderley, recorded in January 1960 and released on the Riverside label. It features Adderley with Bobby Timmons, Wes Montgomery, Sam Jones, Percy Heath, Keter Betts and Louis Hayes in various combinations from a trio to a sextet, with the unusual sound of pizzicato cello to the fore on some tracks.

The title tune was given lyrics and covered the following year by Oscar Brown Jr. on his album Sin And Soul...and then some and has become a standard in both vocal and instrumental forms. It has also been covered in French by Claude Nougaro as "Sing Sing song".

Reception
The album is recognised as one of Adderley's finest. The Allmusic review by Scott Yanow awarded the album 4½ stars, calling it a "near-classic" and stating: "Nat Adderley is heard throughout in peak form, playing quite lyrically. Highly recommended". The Penguin Guide to Jazz awarded the album 4 stars, stating: "Work Song is the real classic, of course, laced with a funky blues feel but marked by some unexpectedly lyrical playing." Colin Larkin awarded the album 4 stars (excellent) in The Virgin Encyclopedia of 60s Music, stating: "…a brilliant amalgam of the soul jazz…".

Track listing
All compositions by Nat Adderley except where noted.
 "Work Song" (Nat Adderley, Oscar Brown Jr) – 4:15  
 "Pretty Memory" (Bobby Timmons) – 3:54  
 "I've Got a Crush on You" (George Gershwin, Ira Gershwin) – 2:55  
 "Mean to Me" (Fred E. Ahlert, Roy Turk) – 5:01  
 "Fallout" – 4:54  
 "Sack of Woe" (Julian Adderley) – 4:28  
 "My Heart Stood Still" (Lorenz Hart, Richard Rodgers) – 6:25  
 "Violets for Your Furs" (Tom Adair, Matt Dennis) – 3:50  
 "Scrambled Eggs" (Sam Jones) – 3:20  
Recorded at Reeves Sound Studios in New York City on January 25, 1960 (tracks 2, 4, 5 & 7) and January 27, 1960 (tracks 1, 3, 6, 8 & 9)

Personnel
Nat Adderley – Cornet 
Wes Montgomery – guitar 
Bobby Timmons – piano (tracks 1, 2, 5, 6 & 9)
Sam Jones – bass, cello 
Keter Betts – bass, cello
Percy Heath – bass
Louis Hayes – drums

References

1960 albums
Riverside Records albums
Nat Adderley albums
Jazz compositions in F minor